NGC 7814 (also known as UGC 8 or Caldwell 43) is a spiral galaxy about 40 million light-years away in the constellation Pegasus.  The galaxy is seen edge-on from Earth.  It is sometimes referred to as "the little sombrero", a miniature version of Messier 104.  The star field behind NGC 7814 is known for its density of faint, remote galaxies as can be seen in the image here, in the same vein as the Hubble Deep Field.

One supernova has been observed in NGC 7814:  SN 2021rhu (Type Ia, mag 12.2).

See also 
 Sombrero Galaxy

References

External links 

 NOAO: NGC 7814 
 NGC 7814 imaged via the Virtual Telescope robotic facility
 

Unbarred spiral galaxies
Pegasus (constellation)
7814
00008
00218
043b